Atasthalistis hieropla is a moth in the family Gelechiidae. It was described by Edward Meyrick in 1919. It is found in Fiji.

The wingspan is about 19 mm. The forewings are purple blackish with a rather broad whitish-yellow streak just below the costa from the base, somewhat sinuate away from the costa beyond the middle, and terminating on the costa at three-fourths. Beyond this is a white marginal line running around the costa and termen to the tornus, twice interrupted on the costa. The hindwings are bright deep orange.

References

Moths described in 1919
Dichomeridinae
Moths of Fiji